War of Money (also known as Money's Warfare) is a 2007 South Korean television drama series adaptation of Park In-kwon's comic of the same name. Starring Park Shin-yang and Park Jin-hee, it aired on SBS from May 16 to July 19, 2007 on Wednesdays and Thursdays at 21:55 for 20 episodes.

Originally scheduled for 16 episodes, due to its popularity it was extended to 20, but only Park Shin-yang starred in the four-episode "bonus round."

Plot
Geum Na-ra was once a top-ranked investment banker, until his life falls apart when his debt-ridden father commits suicide after constantly being harassed by loan sharks. Traumatized, his mother collapses and is rushed to the hospital. Na-ra applies for a bank loan but is flatly denied, and his disgruntled boss takes advantage of Na-ra's troubles and uses them as an excuse to fire him. His mother eventually dies, despite his and his sister Eun-ji's (Lee Young-eun) desperate efforts to obtain cash to pay for her hospital fees. Newlywed Eun-ji had become a room salon hostess, while Na-ra agreed to break up with his longtime girlfriend Lee Cha-yeon (Kim Jung-hwa) in exchange for cash from Cha-yeon's disapproving grandmother Madam Bong (Yeo Woon-kay). Believing that it's the source of all evil, Na-ra declares war on money and becomes obsessed with avenging his parents' deaths. However, realizing the only way to defeat his enemy is to understand the enemy, Na-ra decides to become a loan shark himself, and begins working as a ruthless money collector for the notorious loan shark Ma Dong-po (Lee Won-jong), while learning the trade secrets along with life's philosophies from the old and legendary pro Dokgo Chul (Shin Goo) who reluctantly takes Na-ra under his wing.

Na-ra enters into a rivalry with Ha Woo-sung (Shin Dong-wook), another moneylender who works for Madam Bong and has secretly loved Cha-yeon for years. Then Na-ra meets Seo Joo-hee (Park Jin-hee). Joo-hee was supposed to marry a divorced man to solve her family's financial problems, but on the day of the wedding, Na-ra showed up to collect the debts and ended up ruining her plans. Joo-hee vows to take her revenge on him but she falls in love with him instead. When Na-ra learns that his gangster boss Ma Dong-po was the very man responsible for his father's death, he keeps his cool, waiting for the right time and the right place to seek his revenge. Meanwhile, competition between banks and loan sharks is getting tense and a war over money threatens to erupt.

Cast

Main characters
Park Shin-yang as Geum Na-ra
Park Jin-hee as Seo Joo-hee
Shin Dong-wook as Ha Woo-sung
Kim Jung-hwa as Lee Cha-yeon

Supporting characters
Shin Goo as Dokgo Chul
Lee Won-jong as Ma Dong-po
Lee Young-eun as Geum Eun-ji
Jung Jae-soon as Lee Kyung-ja
Nam Il-woo as Geum Sang-soo
Park In-hwan as Seo In-chul
Jung Soo-young as Kim Hyun-jung
Jang Dong-jik as Kang In-hyuk
Yeo Woon-kay as Madam Bong
Kim Roi-ha as Kim Dong-goo
Lee Moon-sik as boss of securities company 
Kim Hyung-bum as Jo Chul-soo
Lee Jae-yong as Oh Jae-bong
Choi Sung-ho as Lee Young-suk
Kim Kwang-sik as Soo-pyo
Kim Hee-jung as Dong-po's wife
Jo Sang-ki as wayward son
Lee Ki-yeol as insurance examiner
Min Ji-young as Eun-joo
Lee Byung-joon as Kim Min-goo
Lee Dol-hyung as homeless person
Im Sung-eun as swindler
Choi Min as inspector of So-Mang bank 
Park Seung-jae as the CEO
Kim Yong-il as the CEO's right-hand man

Awards and nominations

Ratings
In the table below,  represent the lowest ratings and  represent the highest ratings.
NR denotes that the drama did not rank in the top 20 daily programs on that date.

War of Money Bonus Round
Because of the series' high viewership ratings of over 30%, SBS filmed an additional four episodes featuring new characters and a new plot not found in the original comic, titled War of Money Bonus Round. Park Shin-yang was the only main cast member who reprised his role (Park Jin-hee and Shin Goo were unable due to scheduling conflicts). Among his costars were Kim Ok-bin, who played Geum Na-ra's girlfriend, and Park Hae-mi, who portrayed a physically-challenged moneylending tycoon. Under the theme "poetic justice" or "dilemma," the bonus round did not focus on revenge, but on Na-ra's new challenges as an ingenious debt collector. Ratings were also successful, recording over 25%.

Cast
Park Shin-yang as Geum Na-ra
Kim Ok-bin as Lee Soo-young
Jung So-young as Kang Hye-won
Park Hae-mi as Chairwoman Jin
Seo Jun-young as Kim Byul, Chairwoman Jin's son
Chae Min-seo as beautiful lady (cameo)
Park Jin-hee as ex-secretary of a corrupt congressman (cameo, ep 4)

Controversy

The producers agreed, but later reneged on the deal, alleging that Park tried to capitalize on the drama's high popularity by asking for too much money. Park took legal action, and in November 2009, he won the lawsuit, with the Seoul District Court ruling (upheld by the Seoul High Court) that "although the guarantees promised in the extra contract were three times higher than those paid for Park's appearances in the original contract," the two contracts were independent of each other, and the second contract was legal and binding.

Consequently, the Corea Drama Production Association (CODA) banned Park from appearing in any dramas produced by members of the association for an indefinite period. Following CODA's announcement, about 5,600 overseas fans issued a joint petition to denounce the decision.

After a three-year absence on television, the ban on Park was lifted in 2011.

Remake
A Japanese drama remake also titled , starring Tsuyoshi Kusanagi and Yuko Oshima, will air on Fuji TV in January 2015.

References

External links
 War of Money official SBS website 
 
 

Seoul Broadcasting System television dramas
2007 South Korean television series debuts
2007 South Korean television series endings
Korean-language television shows
Television shows based on manhwa
South Korean thriller television series
Television series by Victory Contents